Suzette Charlotte Marie Mathilde Roux (January 31, 1908 – January 24, 1989), screen name "Suzet Maïs", was a French stage and film actress.

Selected filmography

References

External links

1908 births
1989 deaths
French film actresses
Actresses from Paris
20th-century French actresses